A painted, fiberglass statue of Christopher Columbus was prominently installed for more than 30 years on public land in Columbus, Wisconsin, United States. Following public debate stemming from a petition initiated by a 15-year-old city resident, the statue was removed and placed into storage in July 2020.

See also
 List of monuments and memorials removed during the George Floyd protests

References

Columbus, Wisconsin
Monuments and memorials in Wisconsin
Monuments and memorials to Christopher Columbus
Outdoor sculptures in Wisconsin
Sculptures of men in Wisconsin
Statues in Wisconsin
Columbus, Wisconsin
Removed statues